Paul Merlyn Buhle (born September 27, 1944) is a (retired) Senior Lecturer at Brown University, author or editor of 35 volumes including histories of radicalism in the United States and the Caribbean, studies of popular culture, and a series of nonfiction comic art volumes. He is the authorized biographer of C. L. R. James.

Biography
Buhle was born in Champaign, Illinois, on September 27, 1944. His mother was a registered nurse with the maiden name of Pearle Drake. His father, Merlyn Buhle, was a geologist. On December 30, 1963, Paul Buhle married Mari Jo Kupski, who later earned a doctorate in history and co-authored several works with Buhle.

Buhle graduated from the University of Illinois in 1966, where he had been a spokesperson for the chapter of Students for a Democratic Society's antiwar activities. He received a master's degree from the University of Connecticut (in 1967) and a Ph.D. from the University of Wisconsin–Madison (in 1975). He had been active in the civil rights movement in SDS, and a member for some months of the Socialist Labor Party. In 2006–07, he was one of the founding figures of the new Students for a Democratic Society, and more recently a leader of the Movement for a Democratic Society.

Buhle was founding editor of the journal Radical America (1967–1999), an unofficial organ of Students for a Democratic Society, founder of Cultural Correspondence (1977–83), a journal of popular culture studies, and founder and director of the Oral History of the American Left archive at New York University in 1976. In Rhode Island, he co-founded the Rhode Island Labor History Society, was active in labor history and labor support activities and produced several popular histories of the state's labor movement. He also produced Vanishing Rhode Island, a pictorial history and plea for preservation; and with his students, Underground Rhode Island. He has contributed frequently to the journals and newspapers The Nation, The Village Voice, Monthly Review, Jewish Currents, The Chronicle of Higher Education and The San Francisco Chronicle.

Buhle is the co-author of four books on the history of the Hollywood Blacklist, and the editor of a series of graphic non-fiction works by American comics artists and writers, among them Harvey Pekar, Sabrina Jones and Sharon Rudahl.

He is a member of the Democratic Socialists of America.

Career
Buhle taught at the Cambridge-Godard Graduate School, 1971–73, and lectured at the Rhode Island School of Design until accepting an appointment as lecturer in History and American Civilization at Brown University in 1995. In 1982–83 he created an oral history collection at the Tamiment Library, New York University, the Oral History of the American Left Collection, with associated research on ethnic radicalism. He has served on the Board of The Minnesota Review, as Contributing Editor to Tikkun, and on the editorial advisory board on Radical Americas (an on-line publication of MDS). He has also been a sponsor of New Politics and an adviser on documentary biographies of Howard Zinn, comic artist Will Eisner, and Sacco and Vanzetti, and served as historian for the radio series Grandma was an Activist in the 1980s.

Selected bibliography

Books:
 Co-editor, Prophet Against Slavery (2022)
 Co-editor, Herbert Marcuse, Philosopher of Utopia (City Lights, 2019)
 Co-editor, Yiddishkeit: Jewish Vernacular & the New Land (2011)
 Co-author, with Howard Zinn and Mike Konopacki of A People's History of American Empire (2008),
 Editor, Che Guevara, a Graphic Biography (2008)
 Editor, Jews and American Popular Culture, 3 volumes (2007)
 Author, Tim Hector, Caribbean Radical (2006)
 Co-editor, Wobblies! A Graphic History of the Industrial Workers of the World (2005)
 Co-editor, The New Left Revisited (2004)
 Co-author, Hide in Plain Sight, the Blacklistees in Film and Television, 1950–2002 (2003)
 Co-author, Radical Hollywood (2001)
 Co-author, A Very Dangerous Citizen, Abraham Lincoln Polonsky and the Hollywood Left (1999)
 Co-editor, Encyclopedia of the American Left (1990, 1998), with Mari Jo Buhle and Dan Georgakas
 Co-author, The Tragedy of Empire: A biography of William Appleman Williams (1995)
 Editor, History and the New Left: Madison, Wisconsin, 1950–1970 (1990)
 Author, The Artist as Revolutionary, C. L. R. James (1988)
 Author, Marxism in the United States (1987)

Articles:
 " E. P. Thompson and his Critics ". Telos 49 (Fall 1981). New York: Telos Press
    “The Left and the Class Struggle.” Monthly Review 72 (7) 2020.: 57–63.

See also

 Mari Jo Buhle 
 Dan Georgakas

References

External links

 Salar Mohandesi, 'The Search for a Useable Past: An Interview with Paul Buhle on Radical America' at Viewpoint Magazine, March 2, 2015
 Power to the panels, an interview with Paul Buhle
 Book review (villagevoice.com)
 Josh Jones, "Howard Zinn’s 'What the Classroom Didn’t Teach Me About the American Empire': An Illustrated Video Narrated by Viggo Mortensen", Open Culture, December 9, 2003
 Michael Schapira, "Paul Buhle" (interview), Full Stop, May 21, 2014
Paul Buhle Papers at Tamiment Library and Robert F. Wagner Labor Archives at New York University

1944 births
Living people
People from Champaign, Illinois
American book editors
21st-century American historians
21st-century American male writers
American social sciences writers
Brown University faculty
University of Wisconsin–Madison alumni
Members of Students for a Democratic Society
Members of the Democratic Socialists of America
Historians from Illinois
American male non-fiction writers